The following is the complete filmography of Indian actor, singer, and producer Shatrughan Sinha.

Films

Acting roles

References

External links
 
 

Indian filmographies
Male actor filmographies